In computer networking, promiscuous traffic, or cross-talking, describes situations where a receiver configured to receive a particular data stream receives that data stream and others. Promiscuous traffic should not be confused with the promiscuous mode, which is a network card configuration.

In particular, in multicast socket networking, an example of promiscuous traffic is when a socket configured to listen on a specific multicast address group A with a specific port P, noted A:P, receives traffic from A:P but also from another multicast source. For instance, a socket is configured to receive traffic from the multicast group address 234.234.7.70, port 36000 (noted 234.234.7.70:36000), but receives traffic from both 234.234.7.70:36000 and 234.234.7.71:36000.

This type of promiscuous traffic, due to a lack of address filtering, has been a recurring issue with certain Unix and Linux kernels, but has never been reported on Microsoft Windows operating systems post Windows XP.

Another form of promiscuous traffic occurs when two different applications happen to listen on the same group address. As the former type of promiscuous traffic (lack of address filtering) can be considered a bug at the operating system level, the latter reflects global configuration issues.

References

External links
 Tool to detect promiscuous traffic with the JBoss product
 Cross talking between clusters with same multicast ports but different multicast addresses
 multicast: same port, different IP address? this thread relates of a practical case where a developer wants to use several addresses with a same port.

Computer networking